The Rajabhat Universities mean normal universities in Thailand.

They were formerly called Rajabhat Institutes and originally formed the teachers college system. In 2005, King Bhumibol Adulyadej collectively elevated them to be universities. Many provinces have one—there are 38 total—and they are generally easier to gain admission to than the public universities (formerly the government universities). Most Rajabhat Universities offer graduate degrees, some even to the doctoral level. Enrollments have been shrinking. , students numbered 540,000, down from 600,000.

These institutions are equivalent to British polytechnics that have become universities. They face a similar challenge of matching the prestige of older institutions. They were conferred the royal word Rajabhat to possibly shield them from criticism and help raise their status.

Name
The word "Rajabhat" is derived from the same origin as the Hindi, "Rajput" (from Sanskrit raja-putra, "son of a king"). In this sense, a "Rajabhat University" might be regarded as being analogous to the English "King's College", or "Royal Institute", or more literally as a "Prince's University" ("Rajabhat" could be considered to mean "prince"). For simplicity they may be considered a "Royal University".

List of Rajabhat Universities

Bangkok group
 Bansomdejchaopraya Rajabhat University
 Chandrakasem Rajabhat University
 Dhonburi Rajabhat University
 Phranakhon Rajabhat University
 Suan Dusit Rajabhat University (since 2015 change to Suan Dusit University)
 Suan Sunandha Rajabhat University

Northern group
 Chiang Mai Rajabhat University
 Chiang Rai Rajabhat University
 Kamphaeng Phet Rajabhat University
 Lampang Rajabhat University
 Nakhon Sawan Rajabhat University
 Phetchabun Rajabhat University
 Pibulsongkram Rajabhat University (Phitsanulok)
 Uttaradit Rajabhat University

Northeastern group
 Buriram Rajabhat University
 Chaiyaphum Rajabhat University
 Kalasin Rajabhat University (since 2016 combined to Kalasin University)
 Loei Rajabhat University
 Rajabhat Maha Sarakham University
 Nakhon Ratchasima Rajabhat University
 Roi Et Rajabhat University
 Sakon Nakhon Rajabhat University
  Sisaket Rajabhat University
 Surindra Rajabhat University
 Ubon Ratchathani Rajabhat University
 Udon Thani Rajabhat University
 Nakhon Phanom Rajabhat University (since 2005 combined to Nakhon Phanom University)

Central group
 Phranakhon Si Ayutthaya Rajabhat University (Ayutthaya)
 Muban Chom Bung Rajabhat University (Chom Bung, Ratchaburi)
 Kanchanaburi Rajabhat University
 Nakhon Pathom Rajabhat University
 Phetchaburi Rajabhat University
 Rajabhat Rajanagarindra University (Chachoengsao)
 Rambhai Barni Rajabhat University (Chanthaburi)
 Thepsatri Rajabhat University (Lopburi)
 Valaya Alongkorn Rajabhat University (Khlong Luang, Pathum Thani)

Southern group
 Nakhon Si Thammarat Rajabhat University
 Phuket Rajabhat University
 Songkhla Rajabhat University
 Suratthani Rajabhat University
 Yala Rajabhat University

References